The Cobia is a left tributary of the river Potop in Romania. It flows into the Potop north of Găești.

References

Rivers of Romania
Rivers of Dâmbovița County